David Ross Bragg (June 25, 1956 – March 31, 1997) was a Canadian politician. He represented the electoral districts of Cumberland West and Cumberland North in the Nova Scotia House of Assembly from 1988 to 1996. He was a member of the Nova Scotia Liberal Party.

Born in 1956 at Amherst, Nova Scotia, Bragg was a real estate broker by career. Bragg entered provincial politics in the 1988 election, defeating Progressive Conservative incumbent Gardner Hurley by 83 votes in the Cumberland West riding. He was re-elected in the 1993 election, defeating Progressive Conservative Ernie Fage by over 1200 votes in Cumberland North. On June 11, 1993, Bragg was appointed to the Executive Council of Nova Scotia as Minister of Economic Development. Bragg resigned from cabinet in February 1995. He remained MLA until resigning for health reasons in November 1996. Bragg died on March 31, 1997.

References

1956 births
1997 deaths
Nova Scotia Liberal Party MLAs
Members of the Executive Council of Nova Scotia
People from Amherst, Nova Scotia